
Year 2 BC was a common year starting on Thursday or Friday (link will display the full calendar) of the Julian calendar (the sources differ, see leap year error for further information) and a common year starting on Wednesday of the Proleptic Julian calendar. At the time, it was known as the Year of the Consulship of Augustus and Silvanus (or, less frequently, year 752 Ab urbe condita). The denomination 2 BC for this year has been used since the early medieval period, when the Anno Domini calendar era became the prevalent method in Europe for naming years.

Events 
 Roman Empire 
 Emperor Augustus is proclaimed Pater Patriae, or "father of the country" by the Roman Senate; this bestowed title is the logical consequence and final proof of Augustus' supreme position as princeps, the first in charge over the Roman state.
 Julia the Elder, daughter of Augustus, is exiled on charges of treason and adultery to Pandateria; her mother Scribonia accompanies her.
 The Aqua Alsietina (or Aqua Augusta), a Roman aqueduct in Rome, is constructed during the reign of Augustus (approximate date).

 Parthia 
 Phraates V becomes king of the Parthian Empire, after he and his mother "the goddess Musa" have murdered his father Phraates IV.

Births 
 Jesus, basis of Christianity (born in the month of Ethanim (Tishrei) (September–October) (approximate date, according to Eusebius of Caesarea and Jehovah's Witnesses)
 Gnaeus Domitius Ahenobarbus, father of Nero

Deaths 
 Fu, Chinese Grand Empress of the Han Dynasty
 Iullus Antonius, Roman consul and son of Mark Antony (b. 43 BC)
 Phraates IV, king of the Parthian Empire

References